Kes tahab saada miljonäriks? (English translation: Who wants to become a millionaire?) was an Estonian game show based on the original British format of Who Wants to Be a Millionaire?. The show was hosted by Hannes Võrno and ran for six seasons, from 2002 to 2008. The main goal of the game was to win 1 million EEK (€63,912) by answering 15 multiple-choice questions correctly. There were 3 lifelines - "fifty fifty", "phone a friend" and "ask the audience". The final season introduced the Three Wise Men lifeline from the second milestone. The game show was shown on the Estonian TV station TV3. When a contestant got the fifth question correct, they would leave with at least 1,000 EEK. When a contestant got the tenth question correct, they would leave with at least 32,000 EEK.

Payout structure

Big winners 
 Jevgeni Nurmla - 500 000 EEK (14 March 2004)
  - 500 000 EEK (6 March 2005)
 Klaarika Park - 250 000 EEK (16 March 2003)
 Rein Õue - 250 000 EEK (February 2004)
 Marek Reinaas - 250 000 EEK (December 2004) (Special edition)
 Mati and Artur Talvik - 250 000 EEK (8 May 2005) (Special edition)
 Lia Hanso - 250 000 EEK (20 January 2008)
 Priit Luhtaru and Triine Puppart - 250 000 EEK (17 February 2008)(Special edition)

References

Who Wants to Be a Millionaire?
2000s Estonian television series
2002 in Estonian television
2008 in Estonian television
2002 Estonian television series debuts
2008 Estonian television series endings
TV3 (Estonia) original programming